Christine Harris (born 24 January 1942) is a British former swimmer. She competed in the women's 4 × 100 metre freestyle relay at the 1960 Summer Olympics.

References

1942 births
Living people
Scottish female swimmers
British female swimmers
Olympic swimmers of Great Britain
Swimmers at the 1960 Summer Olympics
Commonwealth Games competitors for Scotland
Swimmers at the 1958 British Empire and Commonwealth Games
Sportspeople from Dunfermline
Scottish female freestyle swimmers